is a private university in the Kichijōji area of the city of Musashino, Tokyo, Japan. 

Its name derives from a passage in the Records of the Grand Historian by Sima Qian. Its campus is noted for its rows of zelkova trees, which is listed as one of the 100 Soundscapes of Japan.

Overview 

The university was established by charter in 1949. Its predecessor dates back to 1906 and was supported by Koyata Iwasaki, the fourth head of the Mitsubishi zaibatsu. Before World War II, this university was managed by donations from Mitsubishi Group. After World War II, it became  independent from Mitsubishi Group through dissolution of the zaibatsu. However, Seikei University still has close connections with the Mitsubishi Group. This university has many graduates from families of noble or business backgrounds.

The university is one of the Tokyo Four Universities (Seikei, Musashi, Seijo, Gakushuin).

Organization

Faculties
Faculty of Economics
Faculty of Law
Faculty of Humanities
Faculty of Science and Technology

Graduate schools
Graduate School of Economics
Graduate School of Business
Graduate School of Law and Political Science
Graduate School of Humanities
Graduate School of Science and Technology
Law School

Research institutes
Center for Asian and Pacific Studies

Academic rankings

Alumni rankings
École des Mines de Paris ranks Seikei University as 89th in the world in 2009 (89th in 2008) in terms of the number of alumni listed among CEOs in the 500 largest worldwide companies. (The university is also ranked 9th in Japan.)

Attached school
Seikei high school（senior high school）
Seikei high school has an exchange study program with St. Paul's School and Phillips Exeter Academy in New Hampshire and Cowra High School in New South Wales, Australia. And there is a study abroad program with Choate Rosemary Hall, Pembroke College, Cambridge and University of California, Davis.
Seikei junior high school
Seikei elementary school

Notable alumni
Shinzō Abe, former Prime Minister of Japan (2006-2007, 2012–2020), former President of Liberal Democratic Party (Japan)
Keiji Furuya, Japanese politician of the Liberal Democratic Party (Japan)
Shunpei Tsukahara, Japanese politician
Mamoru Takano, Japanese politician of the Democratic Party
Takao Sato, Japanese politician
Izumi Kobayashi, Secretary of Multilateral Investment Guarantee Agency
Yasuyuki Yoshinaga, President of Fuji Heavy Industries
Takashi Kusama, President of Mizuho Securities
Susumu Shirayama, President of Seibu Railway
Toshio Mita, Chairman of Chubu Electric Power
Masahiro Ouga, President of Shogakukan
Shiro Kikuchi, President of Asahi Soft Drinks
Natsuo Kirino, novelist (Naoki Prize winner) 
Ira Ishida, novelist (Naoki Prize winner)
Mariko Koike, novelist (Naoki Prize winner)
Yuichi Takai, novelist (Akutagawa Prize winner)
Aya Takashima, TV announcer
Kiichi Nakai, actor
Shingo Tsurumi, actor
Kei Yamamoto, actor
Luke Takamura, musician and songwriter
Tadashi Nakamura, football player
Hiroshi Kazato, racecar driver
Maria Kamiyama, 2011 Miss Universe Japan
Kwon Ri-se, 2009 Miss Korea contestant and Ladies' Code member
Wataru Ishizaka, politician and social worker

Study abroad agreement

University of Cambridge
University of Edinburgh
University of Manchester
Cardiff University

University of Alcalá
University of Santiago de Compostela

University of Bonn
Heidelberg University
Ludwig Maximilian University of Munich

Jean Moulin University Lyon 3

Dublin City University

Griffith University
Monash University
Murdoch University
University of Queensland

University of Auckland

American University
Western Washington University

University of Victoria
Memorial University of Newfoundland

Tongji University
Fudan University
Peking University
Guangdong University of Foreign Studies
Shanghai Jiao Tong University
East China University of Political Science and Law

Korea University
Ewha Womans University

Chiang Mai University

Asia Pacific University of Technology & Innovation

See also
 Osaka Seikei University, which is a completely different school with no connection to Seikei University.
 Love Live!, university was used as a setting of Otonokizaka High School

References

External links
Seikei University 
Seikei University 

Educational institutions established in 1906

Seikei University
Private universities and colleges in Japan
Mitsubishi
1906 establishments in Japan
Musashino, Tokyo